Marcinkowo  is a village in the administrative district of Gmina Mrągowo, Poland within Mrągowo County, Warmian-Masurian Voivodeship, in northern Poland.

The village has an estimated population of 750.

References

Villages in Mrągowo County